Everybody's Dancin' is the tenth studio album by the funk band Kool & the Gang, released in 1978. It failed to generate any major impact and is considered unsuccessful.

Track listing

References

Kool & the Gang albums
1978 albums
De-Lite Records albums